Voice of Reason or The Voice of Reason may refer to:

Literature
 A Voice of Reason: Reflections on Australia, a book by Ian Lowe
 The Voice of Reason, a book by Ayn Rand, Leonard Peikoff, and Peter Schwartz
 "The Voice of Reason", a short story by Andrzej Sapkowski in his 1993 Witcher collection The Last Wish

Music
 Voice of Reason (Harem Scarem album) or the title song, 1995
 Voice of Reason (Rifle Sport album), 1983
 Voice of Reason, an album by the Fountainhead, 1988
 The Voice of Reason, an album by Miilkbone, 2015
 "Voice of Reason" (song), by Noiseworks, 1989
 "Voice of Reason", a song by I Like Trains from Elegies to Lessons Learnt, 2007
 "The Voice of Reason", a song by Asia from Aqua, 1992

Other uses
 "The Voice of Reason" (The Outer Limits), a television episode
 "Voice of Reason", a touring comedy show by Dara Ó Briain